Belgian bantam may refer to:

The breeds of chicken collectively standardised as Belgian Bantam in the United States, Australia and United Kingdom (but classified separately elsewhere).
 Barbu d'Anvers
 Barbu d'Everberg
 Barbu d'Uccle
 Barbu de Grubbe
 Barbu de Watermael
 Barbu de Boitsfort

Or
 Belgian Bantam (Naine belge)

See also
 Dutch Bantam
 List of Belgian chicken breeds